Kormos or Kormoz (Tuvan: кормос; Turkish: Körmöz or Körmös) are spirits in Turkic mythology and can also refer to ghosts or demons. "Kormos" means "does not see" or "blind" in Turkic languages. The word can also mean "mentally ill".

In the Turkic mythology, Kormoses are devilish entities, living in the underworld. Since a soul can turn into a Kormos after death, they are often associated with ancestral spirits. Other names used for them are Alban, Chahik, Ozor, and more. 

Angelic Kormoses, who help and protect humans are under Ülgen's command. Demonic Kormoses [also called "Sokor Körmös" (blind angel)], who commonly dwell in the underworld and harm humans, are controlled by Erlik. Remaining Kormoses are those who are not particularly good or evil and roam the Earth while suffering in a pathetic state. 

Souls turned into Demonic Kormoses after death can escape the torment and ascend to Uçmag if the good in their core overweighs their evil.

Features
They are all both good and evil spirits. Their chief is Körmös Khan. They are generally treated with a triple classification:
 Souls living on the earth.
 Souls living in underground (Tamag).
 Souls living in the sky (Uçmag). 

The Kormos mostly appear at sunset and at sunrise. That's why these times are considered dangerous. It is dissuade to be awake at this time. They can capture people's souls. The concept of the blind is used for mental or mental illness. In Yakutas, the wandering souls of the dead are called Uğör (Yör). The belief that the souls of the people who died have turned into Körmös is common. Obun the souls of people who died as a result of an accident, those who committed suicide are called Alban. The souls of ancestors are called Ozor. Their leader is known as Kürmez Han. These Kormos are divided into three types:

Arug (Arı) Körmös: Angelic Kormoses. They protect and help the humans who do good deeds. They're at Ülgens command. They try to keep the balance on earth.

Caman (Yaman) Körmös: Demonic Kormoses. They are the servants of Erlik in Tamag. They can abduct and torture people.

Kal (Gal) Körmös: Ghosts who are not particularly good or evil and roam the Earth while suffering in a pathetic state.

Types of Kormos

Yör
They mostly live in Tamag. They are evil spirits. Sometimes they go up to earth and harm humans. They are often mentioned in the beliefs of the Yakuts.

Alban 
They consist of the souls of people who have committed suicide. Their body resembles humans but unlike humans they have extremely long hair, long claws, and inverted eyes and feet.

Çahık
They are the souls of the damned. They can change forms. Their bloody hands, dry eyes and deadly talk are exceedingly dangerous.

Ozor
Expression for the ancestors' souls. They are known to come and help their descendants. Ancestors' souls have a very important place in Tengrism.

References

External links
 Mariko Namba Walter, Eva Jane Neumann Fridman, ''Shamanism: an encyclopedia of world beliefs, practices, and culture, Vol.2.
 Ancient Turkish Religion History-Summary (Eski Türk Dini Tarihi-Özet), Abdülkadir İnan

Ghosts
Turkic demons